The Alliance for Change and Progress (AMP) was a three-party alliance in East Timor. Until February 1, 2018, the alliance was called Parliamentary Majority Alliance. The motto of the coalition was "Hametuk Hametin Nasaun" (English: Strengthen the nation together). The flag of the AMP showed the flags of the three member parties on a white background.

History 

In the 2017 East Timorese parliamentary election, FRETILIN won 23 seats in East Timor's national parliament, CNRT - 22 seats, PLP - 8 seats, PD - 7 seats and KHUNTO - 5 seats.

The talks about a grand coalition between FRETILIN and CNRT failed and the KHUNTO withdrew from the desired governing coalition of FRETILIN, PD and KHUNTO at the last moment, so that a minority government of FRETILIN and PD under Marí Alkatiri was formed in mid-September.

On Oct. 6, the 35 MPs from CNRT, PLP and KHUNTO sent a letter to President Francisco Guterres declaring their willingness to "offer an alternative solution for a government" if the government fails to get their program through Parliament. to ensure "peace, stability and development". Guterres has been criticized for recognizing a minority government instead of "looking for a solution that would have allowed for a majority government". FRETILIN failed to create a consensus between the parties in order to be able to implement the program and state budget.

On October 8, the three opposition parties declared the creation of the "Parliamentary Majority Oppositional Alliance" bloc., with which they want to control the work of the government. On October 12, CNRT, PLP and KHUNTO officially signed an agreement to form the Parliamentary Majority Alliance.

On October 19, the majority of the opposition rejected the government program presented by Alkatiri. The government now had to present a new program. It didn't come to that anymore. Instead, on January 26, 2018, President Guterres decided to dissolve parliament. The date for new elections is expected for April.

On February 1, 2018, the three parties of the AMP decided to work together in the election campaign. For this, the alliance was renamed Aliança para Mudança e Progresso. In a declaration of intent, it was agreed to contest the election with a joint list and to form a coalition after the election. Other forces such as the Democratic National Forum (FDN) are also free to join the AMP.

In the 2018 East Timorese parliamentary election, the AMP managed to win 34 of the 65 seats and thus an absolute majority in parliament with a share of 49.6% (309,663 votes). PLP leader Taur Matan Ruak was sworn in as Prime Minister on June 22, 2018, and now leads the VIII Constitutional Government of East Timor.

In late 2019, CNRT MPs increasingly blamed Prime Minister Taur Matan Ruak for the fact that the majority of CNRT ministers were still out of office after 18 months, as President Guterres blocked their swearing-in. The slow progress on the Tasi Mane project also caused a dispute between the PLP and CNRT. On January 17, 2020, the government proposal for the 2020 budget failed again in parliament. Only the 13 MPs from PLP and KHUNTO voted for the draft. Fifteen opposition MPs voted against, while CNRT coalition MPs and the rest of the opposition abstained. Taur Matan Ruak then declared the end of the AMP. However, President Guterres waived his right to dissolve parliament and call new elections. Instead, he put Taur Matan Ruak in charge of continuing the government.

See also 

 VII Constitutional Government of East Timor

References 

Political organizations based in East Timor
2017 establishments in East Timor
Political parties established in 2017
Political parties disestablished in 2020
Political party alliances